The 'Library and Information Association of South Africa (LIASA) is a professional non-profit organization, representing all institutions and people working in libraries and information services in South Africa.  .

Purpose 
LIASA advocates and supports the provision of efficient, user-orientated and excellent library and information services that aspire to equitable access to information for all communities (literate and illiterate) in South Africa. It represents the interests of and promotes the development and image of libraries and information in South Africa, at a local, provincial and national level to government and other agencies. LIASA also represents the LIS sector at international levels.

LIASA's membership consists of individuals interested in or working in libraries and information services and institutions or organizations that maintain or are interested in libraries and information services. Today LIASA has nearly 1600 members and is nationally and internationally acknowledged and recognised as the professional association.

The Association is divided into 10 branches that reside in each province in the country with two based in Gauteng. The Association is governed by a Representative Council elected by its members. An Executive Committee consisting of elected officials are mandated by the Council to implement its policies and programmes. The Executive Committee's activities are guided by a strategic plan that is revised every 4 years.

The LIASA National Office is located on the Pretoria campus of the National Library of South Africa (NLSA).

History
The Library and Information Association of South Africa (LIASA) was launched on 10 July 1997. The launch marked the end of the process of unification of all existing library organisations in South Africa. This process was initiated in January 1995 at the Conference on Libraries and Information Services in Developing South Africa (LISDESA), which was an initiative of the two largest existing organisations at the time, the South African Institute for Librarianship and Information Science (SAILIS) and the African Library Association of South Africa (ALASA). It was at LISDESA that the first Steering Committee for the Unification of Library and Information Stakeholders (ULIS) was elected and given the mandate to carry forward the process for a new organisation.

At the ULIS-1 conference, held in July 1996 in Johannesburg, an Interim Executive Committee (IEC) was elected and mandated to draft a constitution for discussion by all the stakeholders. The IEC, supported by the Provincial Support Groups (PSGs) representing all nine provinces in the country, arranged the Constituent Conference (aka ULIS-2) at the University of Pretoria in July 1997.

Approximately 450 library and information workers representing all nine provinces in South Africa attended the Constituent Conference. The primary focus was to debate and approve the draft constitution. All delegates were given the opportunity to discuss and propose amendments. On the final morning the final edited draft of the constitution was presented and accepted unanimously. The delegates also voted for the name of the new organisation. A Transitional Executive Committee (TEC) was elected to manage the Association, to prepare for the election of the first Representative Council, and to organise the first annual conference, which took place in November 1998. Of significant note, the acronym LIASA, pronounced as "liyasa", in the Nguni languages, means "the dawning".

Peter Johan Lor, former State Librarian and  former IFLA Secretary General, is listed as the very first LIASA member.

Structure 
The Representative Council is made up of the five elected officials (President, President-Elect, Secretary, Treasurer and Public Relations Officer), the Chairs and Chairs-Elect of the LIASA Branches, Chairs of the Interest Groups, as well as the Editors of LIASA-in-Touch  (the official magazine) and the South African Journal of Libraries and Information Science (SAJLIS).

The Executive Committee is made up the five elected officials and four additional Representative Council members. Elections are held every two years and each portfolio is held for a two-year term.

Branches: The Library and Information Association of South Africa has 10 branches one in every province and two in Gauteng. Each branch has a committee elected from its paid-up members. Every branch arranges its own meetings and functions, and compiles its own constitution in alignment with the LIASA constitution.

Interest Groups: LIASA has 10 Interest Groups that serve as platforms for membership discussions that cover various areas of interest and specialisation. Members may choose to belong to two (2) Interest Groups at the time of registration. A national meeting of each Interest Group is convened at the annual LIASA Conference. Several Interest Groups have organised pre-conferences at the annual conference, which have exposed members to further training and skills development by experts in the field.

International Achievements 

IFLA, the International Federation of Library Associations and Institutions, of which LIASA is a member organisation, invites bids from different countries to host its annual World Library and Information Congress and Assembly. It attracts approximately 3500 international delegates to this annual congress.

 IFLA 2007 – While still a young organisation in comparison to other library associations (see the List of Library Associations), LIASA won the bid to hold the 73rd IFLA General Congress and Council in Durban, South Africa in 2007.
 IFLA/WLIC 2015 – LIASA was awarded the bid to host the 2015 IFLA World Library and Information Congress in Cape Town, South Africa.

Annual Conference 

The LIASA Conference is held annually during September or October, and since 2011 the Conference rotates between the cities of Durban, Cape Town and Johannesburg/Pretoria. This Conference serves as an opportunity for LIASA members to showcase best practices; learn about national and international trends; and meet experts.

South African Library Week (SALW) 

In 2001 LIASA was tasked with the responsibility of initiating a week during which all types of libraries across the country raise the profile of libraries and market their services in an effort to contribute to the understanding of the important role that libraries play in a democratic society, advancing literacy, making the basic human right of freedom of access to information a reality, and to promote tolerance and respect among all South Africans.
 
After extensive research into the history of libraries in South Africa and consultation with the membership the following proposal was accepted: "That the week within which 20 March falls should be national library Week. In the event of this day failing within a weekend, then the week preceding it would be celebrated as national Library Week."

This is in recognition of the establishment of the first public library by a government proclamation on 20 March 1818, the South African Public Library, now known as the National Library of South Africa (Cape Town Campus). Furthermore, Human Rights Day is celebrated on 21 March and the South African Bill of Rights recognizes and upholds the freedom of access to information as a basic human right. The linking of an important historical event with a crucial date in this new democracy received wide acceptance.

Presidents 
The President of LIASA serves a two-year period, and may be re-elected for office. The following is a list of the current and past presidents of the association:

 2021 - 2023  Nazeem Hardy
2018 - 2021 Nikki Crowster
 2016 - 2018 Mandla Ntombela
 2014 - 2016 Segametsi Molawa
 2012 - 2014 Ujala Satgoor
 2010 - 2012 Naomi Haasbroek
 2008 - 2010 Rachel More
 2006 - 2008 Tommy Matthee
 2004 - 2006 Tommy Matthee
 2002 - 2004 Robert Moropa
 2000 - 2002 Ellen Tise
 1998 - 2000 Ellen Tise

Publications 
LIASA has two official publications, namely:
The South African Journal of Libraries and Information Science (SAJLIS), an open access, peer reviewed and accredited journal, is published twice per year.
Its official magazine, LIASA-in-Touch, is published four times per year.

References 

 Raju, R., 2006. Investigation into the acquisition of statutory status for the South African LIS sector. South African journal of libraries and information science, Vol 72, Issue 2, Aug 25 : 131-140.
 Walker, C. 2004. From NEPI to NCLIS: A "do-decade" of democratisation, 1992-2004. Libraries and Democracy: The vital link. 7th Annual LIASA Conference, Polokwane, Limpopo, 27 September to 1 October 2004. Available at Liasa.org.za

1997 establishments in South Africa
Non-profit organisations based in South Africa
Library associations
Library-related professional associations